Chemical, biological (CB) — and sometimes radiological — warfare agents were assigned what is termed a military symbol by the U.S. military until the American chemical and biological weapons programs were terminated (in 1990 and 1969, respectively).  Military symbols applied to the CB agent fill, and not to the entire weapon. A chemical or biological weapon designation would be, for example, "Aero-14/B", which could be filled with GB, VX, TGB, or with a biological modification kit – OU, NU, UL, etc. A CB weapon is an integrated device of (1) agent, (2) dissemination means, and (3) delivery system. 

Military symbols can sometimes reflect the name of where a chemical agent is manufactured.  For example, chloropicrin has the symbol PS, which was derived from the British town in which it was manufactured during the First World War: Port Sunlight.

Chemical agents

Blood agents

AC – hydrogen cyanide
CK – cyanogen chloride
SA – Arsine

Choking agents

BBC – bromobenzyl cyanide
CL – chlorine
CG – phosgene
DP – diphosgene
KJ – stannic chloride
NC – 80% chloropicrin, 20% stannic chloride
PS – chloropicrin

Blister agents

H – mustard gas
HD – distilled mustard gas
T – O-Mustard
Q – sesquimustard
L – Lewisite
HL – mustard-lewisite mixture
HT – mustard-T mixture
HQ – mustard-Q mixture
HN – nitrogen mustard
ED – ethyl dichloroarsine
MD – methyl dichloroarsine
PD – phenyl dichloroarsine
CX – Phosgene oxime

Tear agents

CA – camite
CN – mace
CNB – mace-benzene mixture
CNC – mace-chloroform mixture
CND
CNS – mace-chloropicrin-chloroform mixture
CS – CS gas
CS1 – micropulverized CS
CS2 – microencapsulated CS
CR – CR gas
CH –

Vomiting agents
DA – diphenylchlorarsine
DC – diphenylcyanoarsine
DM – Adamsite

Psycho agents

BZ – 3-quinuclidinyl benzilate
SN – sernyl (PCP)
K – lysergic acid diethylamide (LSD) [EA 1729]

Nerve agents

GA – tabun [EA1205]
GB – sarin [EA1208]
GB2 – sarin as a binary agent from mixing OPA (isopropyl alcohol+isopropyl amine) + DF [EA5823]
GD – soman [EA1210]
GF – cyclosarin [EA1212]
GE – ethyl sarin
GH – O-isopentyl sarin [EA1221]
GS – S-butyl sarin [EA1255]
GV – (dimethylaminoethyl phosphorodimethyl amidoylfluoridate) [EA5365]
VE – VE nerve agent [EA1517]
VG – Amiton (O,O-diethyl-S-[2-(diethylamino)ethyl] phosphorothioate) [EA1508]
VM – Edemo [EA1664]
VS – (O-Ethyl S-2-(diisopropylamino)ethyl ethylphosphonothiolate) [EA1677]
VP – (3-pyridyl 3,3,5-trimethylcyclohexyl methylphosphonate) [EA1511]
VR – VR nerve agent (O-isobutyl S-(2-diethaminoethyl) methylphosphothioate)
VX – VX nerve agent [EA1701]
TZ – Saxitoxin

Experimental agents

Material Testing Program EA (Edgewood Arsenal) numbers:

EA 1152 - Diisopropyl fluorophosphate (DFP)
EA 1205 - Tabun (GA)
EA 1208 - Sarin (GB)
EA 1210 - Soman (GD)
EA 1212 - Cyclosarin (GF)
EA 1221 - O-isopentyl sarin
EA 1255 - S-butyl sarin
EA 1285 - Tetraethyl pyrophosphate (TEPP)
EA 1298 - Methylenedioxyamphetamine (MDA), an analogue and active metabolite of MDMA
EA 1475 - Methylenedioxymethamphetamine
EA 1476 - A dimethylheptylpyran variant ("red oil")
EA 1508 - VG
EA 1517 - VE
EA 1653 - LSD in tartrate form
EA 1664 - Edemo (VM)
EA 1677 - VS, a "V-series" nerve agent 
EA 1701 - VX
EA 1729 - LSD in free base form
EA 2092 - Benactyzine
EA 2148-A - Phencyclidine (PCP)
EA 2233 - A dimethylheptylpyran variant
Eight individual isomers numbered EA-2233-1 through EA-2233-8
EA 2277 - BZ ("Substance 78" to Soviets)
EA 3148 - A "V-series" nerve agent, Cyclopentyl S-2-diethylaminoethyl methylphosphonothiolate ("Substance 100A" to Soviets)
EA 3167 - A BZ variant
EA 3443 - A BZ variant
EA 3528 - LSD in malleate form
EA 3580 - A BZ variant
EA 3834 - A BZ variant
EA 5365 - GV
EA 5823 - Sarin (GB) as a binary agent from mixing OPA (isopropyl alcohol+isopropyl amine) + DF

Biological agents

Mycotic biological agents

OC - Coccidioides mycosis

Bacterial biological agents

N - anthrax
TR - anthrax
LE - plague
UL - tularemia (schu S4)
TT - wet-type UL
ZZ - dry-type UL
SR - tularemia
JT - tularemia (425)
HO - cholera
AB - bovine brucellosis
US - porcine brucellosis
NX - porcine brucellosis
AM - caprine brucellosis
BX - caprine brucellosis
Y - bacterial dysentery
LA - Glanders
HI - Melioidosis
DK - diphtheria
TQ - listeriosis

Chlamydial biological agents
SI - psittacosis

Rickettsial biological agents
RI - rocky mountain spotted fever
UY - rocky mountain spotted fever
OU - Q fever
MN - wet-type OU
NT - dry-type OU
YE - human typhus
AV - murine typhus

Viral biological agents
OJ - yellow fever
UT - yellow fever
LU - yellow fever
FA - Rift Valley fever
NU - Venezuelan equine encephalitis virus
TD - Venezuelan Equine Encephalitis virus
FX - Venezuelan Equine Encephalitis virus
ZX - Eastern equine encephalitis virus
ZL - smallpox
AN - Japanese B encephalitis

Biological vectors
AP = Aedes aegypti mosquito

Biological toxins

X - botulinum toxin A
XR - partially purified botulinum toxin A
W - ricin toxin
WA - ricin toxin
UC - staphyloccocal enterotoxin B
PG - staphylococcal enterotoxin B
TZ - saxitoxin
SS - saxitoxin
PP - tetrodotoxin

Others

Simulants
MR - molasses residuum
BG - Bacillus globigii
BS - Bacillus globigii
U - Bacillus globigii
SM - Serratia marcescens
P - Serratia marcescens
AF - Aspergillus fumigatus mutant C-2
EC - Escherichia coli
BT - Bacillus thuringiensis
EH - Erwinia hebicola
FP - fluorescent particle

Radiological agent

RA -

References

Bibliography

Chemical warfare
Military terminology
Military symbols